United Bank for Africa Uganda Limited, also UBA Uganda,  is a commercial bank in Uganda. It is licensed by the Bank of Uganda, the central bank and national banking regulator. UBA Uganda is a subsidiary of the United Bank for Africa, headquartered in Lagos, Nigeria, with a presence in twenty African countries, the United Kingdom, France, and the United States. The stock of UBA Transnational trades on the Nigeria Stock Exchange under the symbol UBA.

Location
The headquarters of UBA Uganda are located at Plot 2, Jinja Road, in the central business district of Kampala, the capital and largest city in Uganda. The geographical coordinates of the bank's headquarters are:00°18'49.0"N, 32°35'17.0"E (Latitude:0.313611; Longitude:32.588056).

Overview
UBA Uganda is a retail bank that serves small and medium enterprises (SMEs), large corporations and individual customers. As of 31 December 2021, UBA Uganda's total assets were USh  (approx. US$21.41 million).

History
UBA Uganda commenced operations in May 2008, starting with the opening of the main branch on the Kampala-Jinja Highway in Kampala. The Nigeria-based parent company, United Bank for Africa, started operations in Uganda with a capital base of US$12 million. It was a greenfield start-up.

Within the first six months, the bank established four branches within Kampala and its suburbs.

Ownership
UBA Bank Uganda is a subsidiary of the United Bank for Africa, headquartered in Lagos, Nigeria and with a presence in twenty African countries and the United Kingdom, France, and the United States. The table below illustrates the shareholding in the stock of UBA Bank Uganda, as of December 2019.

Branch network
As of September 2020, UBA Uganda maintained branches at the following locations:

 Jinja Road Branch: Plot. 2 Jinja Road, Kampala Main Branch
 Prestige Branch/Corporate Branch: Plot. 2 Jinja Road, Kampala
 William Street Branch: 17B William Street, Kampala
 Kansanga Branch: Plot. 5277, Block 244, Kansanga, Kampala
 Kikuubo Branch: Downtown, near Senana Supermarket, Kampala 
 Makerere University Branch: Makerere University Campus, Kampala
 Bugema University Branch: Bugema University Campus, Bugema, Luweero District
 Jinja Branch: 5 Lady Alice Muloki Road, Jinja
 Mbale Branch: 1-3 Manafwa Road, Mbale
 Fort Portal Branch: 8 Ruhandika Street, Fort Portal
 Mbarara Branch: 94 High Street, Mbarara
 Boulevard Mall Branch: Plot 17/19, Kampala Road, Kampala 
 Forest Mall Branch: Forest Mall, Lugogo By-Pass, Kampala
 Ntinda Branch: First Floor, Ntinda Complex, Ntinda, Kampala 
 Mukono Branch: First Floor, Cathedral House, Plot 37-39, Mukono 
 Gulu Branch: Plot No.15 Queens Avenue, Gulu.

Recent developments
Effective 1 October 2021, Bank of Uganda, the central bank and national banking regulator, named UBA Uganda Limited, as a Primary Dealer Bank (PDB). PDBs are authorised to "facilitate the buying and selling of treasury bills and bonds to investors who do not have access to the primary market". The seven other PDBs are (1) Stanbic Bank Uganda Limited (2) Centenary Bank (3) Standard Chartered Uganda (4) Absa Bank Uganda Limited (5) DFCU Bank (6) Bank of Baroda (Uganda) and (7) Housing Finance Bank.

See also

 Banking in Uganda
 List of banks in Uganda

References

External links
 Official website
 Summarized Financial Statements For The Year Ended 31 December 2018
 UBA Banks Johnson Agoreyo Leads Bank Into Third Straight Year of Profit Sealing An End To An 8-Year Profit Dry Spell As of 9 April 2019. 

Banks of Uganda
Banks established in 2008
2008 establishments in Uganda
Companies based in Kampala
Economy of Uganda
United Bank for Africa
Kampala Central Division